Gilbert Kabere M'mbijiwe was a Kenyan politician. He  was a minister for Agriculture and a former member of parliament for the Meru Central and South Imenti Constituency. He had throat cancer.

References

Year of birth missing (living people)
Living people
Members of the National Assembly (Kenya)
Ministers of Agriculture of Kenya